Hayesville is a city in Keokuk County, Iowa, United States. The population was 41 at the time of the 2020 census.

Geography
Hayesville is located at  (41.264570, -92.248880).

Demographics

2010 census
As of the census of 2010, there were 50 people, 24 households, and 16 families living in the city. The racial makeup of the city was 100.0% White.

There were 24 households, of which 16.7% had children under the age of 18 living with them, 58.3% were married couples living together, 4.2% had a female householder with no husband present, 4.2% had a male householder with no wife present, and 33.3% were non-families. 20.8% of all households were made up of individuals, and 12.5% had someone living alone who was 65 years of age or older. The average household size was 2.08 and the average family size was 2.44.

The median age in the city was 55.3 years. 10% of residents were under the age of 18; 6% were between the ages of 18 and 24; 18% were from 25 to 44; 38% were from 45 to 64; and 28% were 65 years of age or older. The gender makeup of the city was 48.0% male and 52.0% female.

2000 census
As of the census of 2000, there were 64 people, 28 households, and 19 families living in the city. The racial makeup of the city was 100.00% White.

There were 28 households, out of which 25.0% had children under the age of 18 living with them, 60.7% were married couples living together, 3.6% had a female householder with no husband present, and 32.1% were non-families. 21.4% of all households were made up of individuals, and 14.3% had someone living alone who was 65 years of age or older. The average household size was 2.29 and the average family size was 2.68.

In the city, the population was spread out, with 18.8% under the age of 18, 7.8% from 18 to 24, 23.4% from 25 to 44, 29.7% from 45 to 64, and 20.3% who were 65 years of age or older. The median age was 45 years. For every 100 females, there were 82.9 males. For every 100 females age 18 and over, there were 92.6 males.

The median income for a household in the city was $38,125, and the median income for a family was $36,250. Males had a median income of $33,750 versus $16,250 for females. The per capita income for the city was $15,973. None of the population and none of the families were below the poverty line.

Education
The community is within the Sigourney Community School District.

References

Cities in Iowa
Cities in Keokuk County, Iowa